Johannes von Helmont, O.S.B. (died 1519) was a Roman Catholic prelate who served as Auxiliary Bishop of Trier (1508–1517).

Biography
Johannes von Helmont was ordained a priest in the Order of Saint Benedict. On 7 February 1508, he was appointed during the papacy of Pope Julius II as Auxiliary Bishop of Trier. On 7 July 1508, he was consecrated bishop. He served as Auxiliary Bishop of Trier until his resignation in July 1517. He died on 9 November 1519.

References 

16th-century Roman Catholic bishops in the Holy Roman Empire
Bishops appointed by Pope Julius II
Benedictine bishops
1519 deaths

Year of birth unknown